Sepedonea is a genus of flies in the family Sciomyzidae, the marsh flies or snail-killing flies.

Species
S. barbosai Knutson & Bredt, 1976
S. canabravana Knutson & Bredt, 1976
S. giovana Marinoni & Mathis, 1991
S. guatemalana (Steyskal, 1951)
S. guianica (Steyskal, 1951)
S. incipiens Freidberg, Knutson & Abercrombie, 1991
S. isthmi (Steyskal, 1951)
S. lagoa (Steyskal, 1951)
S. lindneri (Hendel, 1932)
S. neffi Freidberg, Knutson & Abercrombie, 1991
S. telson (Steyskal, 1951)
S. trichotypa Freidberg, Knutson & Abercrombie, 1991
S. veredae Freidberg, Knutson & Abercrombie, 1991

References

Sciomyzidae
Sciomyzoidea genera